Tondabayashi Jinaimachi is a popular name of the old temple-based town (Jinaimachi) located in Tondabayashi City, Osaka Prefecture, Japan. It is one of the Important Preservation Districts for Groups of Traditional Buildings (1997) in Tondabayashi-shi Tondabayashi. The town retains town blocks from the Sengoku period, along with machiyas (traditional wooden town residences) built from the mid-Edo period on.

Geography 
Tondabayashi Jinaimachi is located at the center of the city, on a fluvial terrace at left bank of the Ishi river and the midstream. Most of the old town area falls within the jurisdiction of Tondabayashi-cho; the rest of the area is in Hon-machi. Tondabayashi-cho adheres to the old town since the Edo period.

The town has an area of 12.9 hectares. It was formed in an ellipsoidal form, measuring 400m from east to west and 350m from north to south. The town layout was designed with a grid plan, which consists of six streets in a north–south direction and seven streets in an east–west direction. There are 25 quadrilateral town blocks in the center, and 16 irregular town blocks on the outer edge.

The relative elevation is about 10m from the river to the town. It used a natural terrace cliff to construct the earthworks with bamboo groves at the eastern, southern and western edge of the town, and the dug-out moat at the northern edge.

History 
About 1558 (Eiroku 1), Kosho-ji temple obtained a wasteland of the Tonda for temple grounds. Kosho-ji temple cooperated with eight headmen to construct a branch temple, town blocks, residences and dry fields. They changed the name of Jinaimachi to Tondabayashi.

In the Sengoku period, Kosho-ji branch temple and Jinaimachi were granted privileges and immunities by authorities. The town people governed autonomously against a background of religious authority of Kosho-ji temple.

Over the Edo period, the town forfeited its privileges and immunities. In the early Edo period, the town was developed as Zaigoumachi (merchant town in the countryside). Many people came from the surrounding villages and the town prospered with merchants offering lumber, cotton, rapeseed oil, and sake.

After the Meiji Restoration, the town continued to prosper as the political and commercial center of southern Kawachi. From the latter Meiji period onward, the town headed gradually into a decline due to the opening of the railway, land reform, and motorization. As a result, it was left out of postwar development.

Traditional buildings

Temples 
Kosho-ji branch temple
Myokei-ji temple
Jokoku-ji temple

Machiyas 
Old Sugiyama family residence
Nakamura family residence

Modern architectures 
Nakauchi ophthalmic clinic

Notable people 
 Tsuyuko Isonokami

See also 
Tondabayashi, Osaka

References

External links 

Tourist attractions in Osaka Prefecture
Buildings and structures in Osaka Prefecture
History of Osaka Prefecture
Tondabayashi, Osaka